Yabalchevo is a village in Ruen Municipality, in Burgas Province, in southeastern Bulgaria.

Institutions 
The public institutions in the village are a mayor's office, Elementary school "Dr. Petar Beron", founded in 1903, and a whole-day kindergarten. The majority of the population are Muslims.

Gallery

References

Villages in Burgas Province